Rosedale Township may refer to the following townships in the United States:

 Rosedale Township, Jersey County, Illinois
 Rosedale Township, Mahnomen County, Minnesota